John Worthington may refer to:

 John Worthington (academic) (1618–1671), English academic and diarist
 John Tolley Hood Worthington (1788–1849), U.S. Representative from Maryland
 John Worthington (British politician) (1872–1951), British surgeon, businessman and politician
 John Hubert Worthington (1886–1963), British architect
 John Worthington (architect), professor of architecture at York University
 John Worthington (Neighbours), fictional character on the Australian soap opera Neighbours